Stockholm commuter rail is the commuter rail system in Stockholm County, Sweden. The system is an important part of the public transport in Stockholm, and is controlled by Storstockholms Lokaltrafik. The tracks are state-owned and administered by the Swedish Transport Administration, while the operation of the Stockholm commuter rail services itself has been contracted to MTR Nordic since December 2016.

History

Local trains have been operated on the mainline railways around Stockholm since the late nineteenth century. At the beginning, local rail services were part of the Swedish State Railways, but in the late-1960s, the responsibility for these services was transferred to Stockholm County, which incorporated it with the ticketing system of Stockholm Transport. New trains were bought, stations were modernised, and the Stockholm commuter rail network was developed with an aim of making it more metro-like. Originally the system was branded as SL förortståg, and later as SL lokaltåg. Only in the 1980s did the system officially become known as Stockholms pendeltåg.

In its first year of operation there was only one route which went from Södertälje södra (now Södertälje Hamn) to Kungsängen via Stockholm Central Station. On 1 June 1969, the system was extended to Märsta via a branch located after Karlberg Station (sv) and a new service was created in which trains on the Kungsängen branch terminated at Stockholm C instead. In 1975 another branch line opened to Västerhaninge, with a single-track shuttle service to Nynäshamn. Trains on the Kungsängen branch now terminated at Västerhaninge instead of Stockholm C and which now forms part of the modern line 35.

From 1986 until 1996, important improvements were made to the railways around Stockholm. Single-track stretches were upgraded to double tracks, and some double-track stretches were upgraded to four-track, allowing the commuter trains to run with less interference from other rail services. The service frequency was gradually increased, and from 2001 most stations on the network are served by trains at regular 15-minute intervals, with additional trains during rush hours.

In 2001, the northwestern arm of the network was extended from Kungsängen to Bålsta. A southern infill station at Årstaberg was inaugurated in 2006, in order to connect with the then new Tvärbanan tram system. A new station at Gröndalsviken opened on the southeastern Västerhaninge-Nynäshamn shuttle on 18 August 2008.

Since 9 December 2012, it has been possible for Stockholm commuter rail trains to stop at Stockholm Arlanda Airport. Journeys take 38 minutes from Arlanda C station to Stockholm C, and 18 minutes from Arlanda C to Uppsala C. Discussions on the expansion began in December 2007. The airport has had express service from Stockholm Central through Arlanda Express since 1999, and was also reachable by bus from Märsta station. The implementation required negotiations between Stockholm Transport and Arlanda Express, who had operating rights for the tracks.

A rail tunnel underneath central Stockholm began construction in 2008 and opened on 10 July 2017. This new tunnel, known as Stockholm City Line (Citybanan; lit. ‘the city line’), is intended for the exclusive use of the Pendeltåg system, and splits commuter traffic onto separate tracks from long-distance trains while travelling through the city. This eases the rail systems' congestion problems, and permits Stockholm Transport to schedule more frequent service. It also allows more frequent service for other trains, increasing the capacity for large parts of the Swedish rail network since many trains go to and from Stockholm. Two new underground stations, Stockholm City Station (located under T-Centralen, both stations with connections to Stockholm Central Station) and Stockholm Odenplan station; located under Odenplan metro station, replacing Karlberg Station) were built as part of the Citybanan project.

A new station called Vega (sv), located on the Nynäs Line in Haninge Municipality between Skogås and Handen stations, opened on 1 April 2019 after almost four years of construction. Vega was also the name of a small halt on the Nynäs Line which existed between 1929 and 1973, although it was built at a different location from the current Vega station.

Operation of the Stockholm commuter rail lines has been contracted to private companies since 2000. The first franchise holder was Citypendeln (sv), which operated the Stockholm commuter rail from 2000 until 17 June 2006. From 18 June 2006 until 10 December 2016, the network was operated by Stockholmståg (sv), a subsidiary of SJ AB, the former Swedish State Railways company. Since 11 December 2016, MTR Nordic has operated the services on a ten-year contract with an option to extend for a further four.

Lines

After the rerouting of December 2017, there are two lines on most railways, with different destinations. On top of this, some trains are from this time quick skip-stop trains, 42X and 43X (named with an X after the line number), which skip around four stops per tour.

The shorter line 48 in the southwest connects Gnesta to Södertälje. Line 40 connects Uppsala C in the north to Södertälje in the southwest via Arlanda C, Upplands Väsby and Stockholm City Station, this branch from Uppsala C to Upplands Väsby (where it joins line 41 to Södertälje) used by Line 40 utilises the existing infrastructure of the Arlanda Line and a part of the East Coast Line sharing tracks and platforms with regional and long distance trains.

The line to Nynäshamn beyond Västerhaninge is mostly single track with passing loops. Previously, short platforms and limited passing places meant that a change of train had to be made in Västerhaninge, but as of 2013 the line has been improved with longer platforms and additional loops, and all services are now run through to Stockholm and Bålsta.

Trains operate every 30 minutes from 5 am to 1 am every day, with 15-minute intervals during the daytime. Additional trains during rush hours give an average of 7½ minutes intervals for many stations, and trains every 4½ minutes on the central parts. Line 40, 48 and the outer parts of the railway to Nynäshamn (from Västerhaninge) are served less frequently, with up to one hour between trains on weekends.

390,000 passengers use Stockholm commuter trains on an ordinary weekday (counting connecting passengers double). This is almost half of the total number of train passengers in Sweden, the metro and trams not included.

Stations
There are 53 stations in the network, four of which are beyond the borders of Stockholm County. Eight stations connect with regional and long-distance trains, three connect with the light-rail tram system Tvärbanan, and four stations have access to the Stockholm metro. Several stations are important interchanges to local buses.

Most stations are of a similar style, with an island platform in a ground-level location with one or two exits, turnstiles, and a staffed ticket office. A few interchange stations have multiple platforms. The stations south of Västerhaninge and Södertälje are smaller, and have no ticket vending facilities; passengers buy their tickets from the train conductor on these parts of the network. The smallest station is Hemfosa, which has approximately 100 boarding passengers per day.

The stations are marked with a J symbol, which just stands for the generic term "järnvägsstation" (i.e. railway station) and is similar to the T symbol used by the Stockholm underground railway stations ("tunnelbanestation").

Rolling stock

Since the opening of the Stockholm City Line (Citybanan) on 10 July 2017, only one train type, the X60 Coradia Nordic trains from Alstom is currently used on the network, due to the use of platform screen doors on the Citybanan. A total of 71 X60 trains were delivered between 2005 and 2008 to replace secondhand X420 trains previously operated by Deutsche Bahn in Germany, and which were imported into Sweden by the then-operator Citypendeln to temporarily increase capacity on the Pendeltåg network. A full-length train with two X60 units measures . In 2016, 46 trains of a new generation of the Coradia Nordic family called X60B entered service to replace the X10 trains originally delivered between 1983 and 1993.

Former

 X1 (from 1968 until 2011) 
 X10 (from 1983 until 2017)
 X20/X23 (from 2001 until 2002)
 DSB Bn passenger coaches hauled by SJ Rc locomotives (from 2001 until 2003)
 X420 (from 2002 until 2005)

See also

List of suburban and commuter rail systems
Public transport in Stockholm

References

 J35  J36  J37

External links

Stockholm Transport - official website
Map of all Stockholm Transport rail lines 
Pendelavstånd till Stockholms central 

MTR Corporation
Regional rail in Sweden
Rail transport in Stockholm County
1968 establishments in Sweden
Railway companies established in 1968
Underground commuter rail